Hannu Vaahtoranta (born 20 May 1943) is a Finnish former swimmer. He competed in three events at the 1964 Summer Olympics.

References

External links
 

1943 births
Living people
Finnish male freestyle swimmers
Olympic swimmers of Finland
Swimmers at the 1964 Summer Olympics
Swimmers from Helsinki
Finnish male medley swimmers
20th-century Finnish people